The Mark 31 torpedo was a destroyer-launched acoustic torpedo developed by the Harvard and Pennsylvania State universities during World War II. A modification of the Mark 18 electric torpedo, it was conceived as an interim weapon to be used in the Pacific War until a new high-speed acoustic torpedo could be developed for the United States Navy.

Further development of the torpedo was terminated due to the status of other more promising programs, notably the Mark 16 torpedo and the Mark 35 torpedo.

See also
Mark 18 torpedo
American 21 inch torpedo

References

Torpedoes
Torpedoes of the United States
Unmanned underwater vehicles